Iglika is a village in Gabrovo Municipality, in Gabrovo Province, in northern central Bulgaria.

Iglika Passage in the South Shetland Islands, Antarctica, is named after Iglika.

References

Villages in Gabrovo Province